The Golden Pyramid Award is the highest prize for best film in the international competition of the Cairo International Film Festival, hosted annually in Cairo, Egypt.

References 

Cairo International Film Festival
Egyptian film awards